Frank J. Hall (16 February 1844 – 19 August 1925) was an American politician from the U.S. state of Indiana. Between 1909 and 1913 he served as Lieutenant Governor of Indiana.

Life
Frank Hall was born in Rush County in Indiana where he grew up on his father’s farm. At the age of 17 he worked as a teacher for two years. Later he studied law at the Indiana University in Bloomington and in 1869 he was admitted to the bar. Afterwards he became an attorney. Among his clients were several Railroad Companies. He joined the Democratic Party and was elected to the mayor’s office in Rushville (Indiana). Twice he ran unsuccessfully for a seat in the Indiana House of Representatives.

Inn 1908 Frank Hall campaigned successfully for the office of the Lieutenant Governor of Indiana. He served in this position between 11 January 1909 and 13 January 1913 when his term ended. As Lieutenant Governor he was the deputy to Governor Thomas R. Marshall and he presided over the Indiana Senate. There is not much information available about his life after he left politics. He died on 19. August 1925 in Indianapolis.

External links
 The Political Graveyard
 Online Biography of Frank Hall

Literature
Indiana University. Alumni Association: Indiana University Alumni Quarterly. : volume 12, Alumni Association of Indiana University, Bloomington, Ind., 1925, page 520.

1844 births
1925 deaths
Lieutenant Governors of Indiana
Indiana Democrats